The Valverda Plantation is a Southern plantation with a historic mansion located in Maringouin, Louisiana, USA. It was designed in the Greek Revival architectural style, and completed in 1850. It has been listed on the National Register of Historic Places since April 1, 2002.

References

Plantation houses in Louisiana
Houses completed in 1850
Greek Revival houses in Louisiana
Houses in Iberville Parish, Louisiana
Houses on the National Register of Historic Places in Louisiana
National Register of Historic Places in Iberville Parish, Louisiana